The economy of the United States is divided into economic sectors. The North American Industry Classification System (NAICS) was developed in 1997 and is used by the United States Census Bureau and U.S. Securities Exchange Commission (SEC).

Economic Census

The United States Census Bureau currently conducts a comprehensive Economic Census every five years.  The results of this survey are tabulated according to the NAICS and provide statistics about the U.S. economy.  The most recent data are from 2007.  The 2012 Economic Census is underway with the initial results to be available in December 2013.

Comparative statistics

The Census Bureau releases sector-by-sector statistics on the number of establishments, total business activity, annual payroll, and number of paid employees.  A standardized classification of the economy into sectors makes it possible to compare census results over time.  However, to reflect the evolving nature of the economy, the NAICS is updated every five years.  Therefore, when comparing different censuses, a particular NAICS basis is usually specified.  The following data are based on a comparison of the 2007 and 2002 censuses using the 2002 NAICS basis and an older comparison of the 1997 and 2002 censuses using the older 1997 NAICS basis.  Thus, (*) the 1997 data are based on a slightly different classification than the 2007 and 2002 data.

2002 statistics
Sectors of the U.S. Economy in 2002 - firms with payroll - All Sector Totals

See also
 Economy of the United States
 List of largest United States–based employers globally

References

Sector